The Sal Premier Division is a regional championship played in Sal Island, Cape Verde. The winner of the championship plays in Cape Verdean football Championships of each season.  The competition are organized by the Sal Regional Football Association (Associação Regional de Futebol de Sal, ARFS). The Premier Divisions contains eight clubs.  In title history, Académico do Aeroporto has the most titles numbering 14, and is ranked fifth in the most championship titles of any of the island leagues in Cape Verde.  The champion promotes into the Cape Verdean Football Championships each season while the last placed club relegates into the second division the following season.

History
The regional championships was founded shortly after independence and became the four championships to compete at the national level.

SC Verdun from Santa Maria was the first club to win a title, Académico Sal, Palmeira and Académica do Aeroporto were the next club to win a  title, SC Santa Maria was the fifth club to win a title in 1987.  From 1990 to 2014, it was the only regional championship in Cape Verde that every club has won a title, Juventude was the last club who was without a title in 1990.

Up to the 2014 season, the league had only six clubs competing.  From the mid-2000s to 2011, it had the second most clubs in the country, up until 2014, it had the fewest clubs in the country after Maio and Brava.  When the Second Division was introduced, the championships has the fifth most clubs in the nation after São Vicente.

Sal was the most recent club to have a Second Division added in the 2014/15 season, each two divisions had 6 clubs each.  In the following season, two clubs added to the premier division totalling eight.

Broadcasting rights
Its top clubs, the Académica clubs of the island are broadcast on TCV but not often except for a club competing at the national level, it is aired often on its Sal affiliate.

Sal Premier Division - Clubs 2017/18
Académico do Aeroporto - Espargos
Académica do Sal - Espargos
ASGUI - Santa Maria
Florença - Santa Maria
Gaviões - Hortelã, Espoargos - relegated after finishing last
Juventude - Morro Curral, Espargos
Palmeira - Santa Maria - champions
Santa Maria

Winners

Sal Island/Regional Championships

1975/76: Juventude
1977-78: Not held
1977-79: Unknown
1979/80 : Sport Clube Verdun
1981-83 : unknown
1983/84 : Associação Académica do Sal
1984/85 : Palmeira
1985/86 : Académico do Aeroporto
1986/87 : Sport Club Santa Maria
1987/88 : Académico do Aeroporto
1988/89 : Sport Club Santa Maria
1989/90 : Juventude
1990/91 : Juventude
1991/92 : Sport Club Santa Maria
1992/93 : Associação Académica do Sal
1993/94 : Associação Académica do Sal
1994/95 : Académico do Aeroporto
1995/96 : Associação Académica do Sal
1996/97 : Sport Club Santa Maria
1997/98 : Sport Club Santa Maria
1998/99 : Juventude (Sal)
1999/00 : Palmeira
2000/01 : Associação Académica do Sal
2001/02 : Académico do Aeroporto
2002/03 : Académico do Aeroporto
2003/04 : Académico do Aeroporto
2004/05 : Associação Académica do Sal
2005/06 : Académico do Aeroporto
2006/07 : Académico do Aeroporto
2007/08 : Académico do Aeroporto
2008/09 : Sport Club Santa Maria
2009/10 : Académico do Aeroporto
2010/11 : Académico do Aeroporto
2011/12 : Juventude
2012/13 : Académico do Aeroporto
2013/14 : Sport Clube Verdun

Sal Premier Division
2014/15 : Académico do Aeroporto
2015-16: Académico do Aeroporto
2016–17: Académico do Aeroporto
2017–18: GD Palmeira

Performance By Club

Performance by area

Other sporting clubs

Basketball
The island also has its basketball competition.  The competition is run by the Sal Basketball Association (ARBS, Associação de Basquetebol (or Basquete) do Sal).  All of its games are played at Polidesportivo Municipal do Sal. One of its clubs include:

Académico do Aeroporto
GDRC Pretória

See also
Sal Regional Football Association
Sports in Sal, Cape Verde

References

External links
Sal Island League 

 
Second level football leagues in Cape Verde
1975 establishments in Cape Verde
Sports leagues established in 1975